Stenoplax is a genus of polyplacophoran molluscs in the family Ischnochitonidae .

Species
Species within this genus include: 
 Stenoplax alata (G.B. Sowerby II, 1841) 
 † Stenoplax anglica Wrigley, 1943 
 Stenoplax bahamensis  Kaas & Van Belle, 1987
   (Haddon, 1886) 
   Berry, 1956
 Stenoplax conspicua  (Pilsbry, 1892) 
 Stenoplax corrugata  (Carpenter, 1892) 
 Stenoplax fallax  (Carpenter, 1892) 
 Stenoplax floridana  (Pilsbry, 1892) 
   Berry, 1946
 Stenoplax hernandezi  Dell'Angelo, Schwabe, Gori, Sosso & Bonfitto, 2014
 Stenoplax iansa Jardim & Almeida, 2021
 Stenoplax kempfi  (Righi, 1971) 
 Stenoplax lavanononensis Dell'Angelo, Sirenko & Prelle, 2015
 Stenoplax limaciformis  (G.B. Sowerby I, 1832) 
 Stenoplax lindholmii  (Schrenck, 1862) 
 Stenoplax madagassica  (Thiele, 1917) 
 Stenoplax magdalenensis  (Hinds, 1845) 
 Stenoplax marcusi  (Righi, 1971) 
 Stenoplax mariposa  (Dall, 1919) 
 † Stenoplax monila Cherns & Schwabe, 2019 
 † Stenoplax paviai Dell'Angelo, Giuntelli, Sosso & Zunino, 2014 
 Stenoplax petaloides  (Gould, 1846) 
 Stenoplax purpurascens  (C. B. Adams, 1845) 
 † Stenoplax quimperensis Dell'Angelo, Bonfitto & Taviani, 2011 
 Stenoplax rugulata  (G.B. Sowerby I, 1832) 
 † Stenoplax selseiensis Wrigley, 1943 
 † Stenoplax sigillarius Bielokrys, 1999 
 Stenoplax sonorana  Berry, 1956
 † Stenoplax veneta Dell'Angelo & Palazzi, 1992 
 Stenoplax venusta  (Is. & Iw. Taki, 1931) 
Synonyms
 Stenoplax histrio Berry, 1945: synonym of Stenoplax mariposa (Dall, 1919)
 Stenoplax isoglypta S. S. Berry, 1956: synonym of Stenoplax boogii (Haddon, 1886)

References

External links
 Dall, W. H. (1879). Report on the limpets and chitons of the Alaskan and Arctic regions, with descriptions of genera and species believed to be new. Proceedings of the United States National Museum. 1: 281-344, pls 1-5

Chiton genera
Ischnochitonidae